Danilo Ildefonso (born December 9, 1976) is a Filipino former professional basketball player. He serves as an assistant coach for both the Converge FiberXers of the Philippine Basketball Association (PBA) and the NU Bulldogs of the UAAP. Nicknamed "Danny I", "The Demolition Man" and "Lakáy", Ildefonso is a two-time PBA Most Valuable Player in 2000 and 2001 and is one of the four players to win the said award on back-to-back seasons, along with Bogs Adornado, Alvin Patrimonio, and June Mar Fajardo. He also one of the few PBA players to have won all three major MVP awards in the league: regular season, finals, and all-star game MVP. He was picked 1st overall in the 1998 PBA draft and the 2014 PBA Expansion Draft, becoming the only player in the PBA to be drafted first-overall two times and being drafted first-overall in the draft and the expansion draft. 

Ildefonso played amateur basketball for the National University Bulldogs in the UAAP and for AGFA in the Philippine Basketball League and a member of the Philippine national basketball team on several occasions. He started his PBA career in 1998, when he was drafted by Formula Shell. In 2013, after 15 years with San Miguel, he was waived by the team and then joined the Meralco Bolts in the same year. He spent one season with Meralco before being released to the 2014 Expansion Draft. However, Blackwater Elite who drafted him, did not sign him because of contract problems, stating that Ildefonso is expecting too much salary on the team. Ildefonso defended himself stating that his wage with the team is very low. In late 2014, Ildefonso returned to Meralco.

Amateur career
Ildefonso was discovered after suiting up for his native Pangasinan in the Palarong Pambansa. He played for the NU Bulldogs in the UAAP, teaming up with fellow Pangasinense and later-AGFA and San Miguel teammate Lordy Tugade, leading the Bulldogs to respectable finishes in the UAAP. He later played for AGFA in the Philippine Basketball League but had a difficult time leading the Photokina franchise to the title, losing to Tanduay in championship matches. He was regarded as the second-best big man of his class behind Rommel Adducul, and was highly sought after by then-SMB coach Ron Jacobs after seeing the potential in his rail-thin frame. The tremendous potential seen in his combination of youth, footwork, leaping ability and work ethic as shown by him bulking up after only two seasons in the PBA were enough to convince San Miguel to trade their number two pick, Noy Castillo, and cash for the first overall pick Ildefonso. Ildefonso was also involved in some controversy after signing with the now-defunct Pangasinan Presidents of the MBA, having a live contract with AGFA and at the same time being selected in the draft. San Miguel had to buy out all his contractual obligations for him to suit up with the Beermen.

Ildefonso led the Philippines to a gold-medal in 1997 Southeast Asian Games alongside Rommel Adducul and Ralph Rivera.

Professional career

San Miguel Beermen/Petron Blaze Boosters (1998–2013)

Early years (1998–00)
After a successful amateur career, Danny Ildefonso applied for the PBA draft despite being underage. This prompted the PBA to change their age limit rules, enraging the PBL. Even as Ildefonso entered the draft, he also signed a contract to play for the Pangasinan Presidents of the newly formed Metropolitan Basketball Association.

Ildefonso was eventually drafted first-pick overall by Formula Shell in the 1998 PBA draft, but was traded to San Miguel for the Beermen's second overall pick, Noy Castillo, and cash. The San Miguel Corporation franchise wanted the promising youngster in their ranks to be the future cornerstone of the team and this forced them to buy out his MBA contract.

In his rookie season, Ildefonso became one of the key players for the Beermen alongside Nelson Asaytono, leading the Beermen to two runner-up finish in the All-Filipino and Commissioner's Cup, losing to Alaska on both occasions. At season's end, he won the Rookie of the Year honors while averaging 11.6 PPG in 74 Games which led all Rookies in 1998.

The next season, with the departure of Asaytono and the arrival of Filipino-American rookie Danny Seigle and the performances of imports Terquin Mott and Lamont Strothers, San Miguel won two titles in the 1999 Commissioner's Cup and Governor's Cup, ending a five-year title drought.

Back-to-Back MVP Awards (2000–01)
In 2000, Ildefonso and Seigle would again lead San Miguel to two titles, retaining the Commissioner's and Governor's Cup championships. Ildefonso won the two of the five straight Best Player of the Conference honors and defeated Seigle to win the Most Valuable Player Awards.

In 2001, San Miguel defeated sister team Barangay Ginebra Kings, 4–2 to win the All-Filipino Cup. Despite two losses to Red Bull and Sta. Lucia in the Commissioner's Cup and Governor's Cup finals series, Ildefonso went on to sweep the Best Player of the Conference honors and won his second Most Valuable Player Award, joining Bogs Adornado and Alvin Patrimonio as the only players to win the said award on back-to-back seasons. He also won the All-Star Game MVP honors for the victorious Veterans team. With this feature, Danny Ildefonso became one of the rare players to have won all three major MVP awards in the league: regular season, all-star game, and finals MVP.

Injury plagued seasons (2002–07)
In 2002, Ildefonso temporary left San Miguel to join the Philippine National Training Pool in the preparation for the 2002 Asian Games in Busan. Ildefonso went on to join the team for the event but struggled throughout the Asiad, mainly due to his role of playing small forward, instead of his natural position of power forward. The Nationals ended up in fourth place after losing a heartbreaking semis matchup against South Korea. Ildefonso returned to the Beermen in the All-Filipino Cup but the Beermen placed only third in the said tournament.

Ildefonso would play inconsistent games as well as missing several games due to injuries in the 2003 season and the early parts of the 2004–05 season.

During the 2005 Fiesta Conference, the Beermen made it to the semifinals against Red Bull. Ildefonso played one of his best games of the tournament, and hit numerous clutch shots in the tournament, including a series-clinching game-winning fade away over the outstretched arms of Red Bull import Earl Barron to lead San Miguel to the finals against the Talk 'N Text Phone Pals.

In the championship series, Ildefonso again played another impressive performance for San Miguel, leading them to their first title since 2001 and defeating the Phone Pals, 4–1. During the series, Ildefonso made a game-winning layup in game 2 against Asi Taulava and in Game 5, a running jumper that put San Miguel in the lead for good to clinch the series. Ildefonso was named Finals MVP.

Ildefonso was fined 5,000 pesos by the league after two technical fouls during Game 3 of the 2006–07 Philippine Cup semis. After a first technical foul after a verbal exchange with Mick Pennisi, he was ejected in the fourth quarter during a face-to-face verbal exchange with Enrico Villanueva.

Ups and downs (2008–11)
Bothered by injuries, Ildefonso missed much of the 2008–09 season. In April 2008, he was voted to play as a starter for the North squad in the PBA All-Star Game. However, the former two-time MVP did not play in the All Star Game, as PBA commissioner Sonny Barrios accepted his request to be with his six-year-old daughter who was scheduled for chemotherapy treatment on the same day.

The Petron Blaze Boosters reached the PBA finals this conference after a bad record last conference. He hit a game winning shot in Game 1 against Talk 'N Text Tropang Texters in a come from behind winning score of 89–88. Despite having injuries to four key players, Petron Blaze Boosters defeated the heavily favored Talk and Text for the Governor's Cup Championship, slamming the Texter's bid for a grandslam. His effectiveness and contribution earned him the Comeback Player award last season.

On January 11, 2012, in a game against the Talk 'N Text Tropang Texters, Ildefonso scored a season high 22 points after going 11 of 14 from the field, including a baseline spinner that gave them an 81–80 lead entering the final two minutes. Petron ultimately defeated Talk N' Text 85–82, to take a 3–1 lead in the semifinals of the Philippine Cup. Although Petron lost the series 4–3, the former two time MVP still played an important role for his team.

Final season with Petron (2012–13)
In the 2012–13 season Ildefonso played limited minutes and mostly came off the bench. The two time MVP averaged 1.29 points, 6.93 minutes and 1.57 rebounds in only 14 games, the worst season in his 15 years in the PBA. In his final season, he played an important role by mentoring Petron's 2012 top draft pick June Mar Fajardo, to improve the latter's performances and rebounding.

2013 Free Agency
When the 38th season ended, for the first time since he was acquired by San Miguel Corp.'s flagship franchise from Shell in a draft-day trade in 1998, Danny Ildefonso's name was conspicuously missing from the team's official roster. 
Team sources revealed Ildefonso has indeed been released by Petron after 15 years of playing in his mother team. 
Sources also said the many-time All-Star has no plan to move to another team and the only thing he wants at this time is to mend his relationship with his longtime team.

Meralco Bolts (2013–2014)
After being a free agent for the first time in his career and missing the early games of the 2013–2014 season, Ildefonso was signed by the Meralco Bolts to a one-conference contract. When asked upon the two-time MVP's arrival, head coach Ryan Gregorio said: “I honestly believe that DI still has what it takes to compete at a high level in the PBA. He has been aching for teams to give him a venue to display what he has and we are more than willing to provide him with the opportunity. He has championship experience and high basketball intelligence; things that you cannot teach as a basketball coach, but, you learn through time as a basketball player".

Ildefonso made his debut for Meralco on January 4, 2014, playing 29 minutes and scoring 14 points to help his team win 92–88 in overtime and stopping a 4-game losing streak.

At the end of the 2013–2014 season, Ildefonso became an "unprotected" player and Meralco decided to release him to the 2014 Expansion Draft.

Blackwater Elite and return to Meralco Bolts (2014–2015)
Ildefonso was eventually drafted by debuting expansion team Blackwater Elite as first pick overall, making him the only player in the PBA to be drafted first-overall two times and being drafted first-overall in the draft and the expansion draft. At the start of the 2014–15 season, however, Blackwater did not sign him because of contract problems, stating that Ildefonso was expecting too much salary on the team. The veteran player defended himself stating that his wage with the team is very low.

In late 2014, Ildefonso re–signed with the Meralco Bolts. The two-time MVP made his PBA return on October 28, 2014, in an 83–75 win against Blackwater, the team that released him a few weeks earlier.

Retirement and comeback
On August 23, 2015, he formally announced his retirement to give way for the last team he played, the Meralco Bolts, to rebuild their frontline.

On March 2, 2023, while being an assistant coach for the Converge FiberXers, Ildefonso was activated as their 15th local player in the lineup, thus confirming his official comeback in the PBA. He played his debut for the team on March 3, playing four minutes and recording one rebound.

PBA career statistics

As of the end of 2022–23 season

Season-by-season averages

|-
| align="left" | 1998
| align="left" | San Miguel
| 74 || 32.8 || .497 || .222 || .700 || 5.0 || 1.6 || .2 || 1.0 || 11.7
|-
| align="left" | 1999
| align="left" | San Miguel
| 55 || 41.7 || .481 || .125 || .725 || 8.8 || 2.0 || .5 || 1.2 || 12.9
|-
| align="left" | 2000
| align="left" | San Miguel
| 55 || 38.8 || .482 || .154 || .744 || 8.8 || 3.2 || .4 || .8 || 15.2
|-
| align="left" | 2001
| align="left" | San Miguel
| 70 || 42.2 || .433 || .222 || .675 || 8.6 || 4.5 || .7 || .9 || 14.7
|-
| align="left" | 2002
| align="left" | San Miguel
| 12 || 35.3 || .472 || .417 || .639 || 7.8 || 4.2 || .5 || .5 || 12.3
|-
| align="left" | 2003
| align="left" | San Miguel
| 36 || 29.8 || .470 || .250 || .715 || 6.4 || 2.4 || 1.0 || 1.1 || 13.0
|-
| align="left" | 2004–05
| align="left" | San Miguel
| 65 || 29.9 || .479 || .143 || .660 || 7.0 || 2.4 || 1.0 || .7 || 12.7
|-
| align="left" | 2005–06
| align="left" | San Miguel
| 44 || 32.4 || .434 || .250 || .656 || 6.4 || 3.1 || .6 || .8 || 12.1
|-
| align="left" | 2006–07
| align="left" | San Miguel
| 48 || 28.0 || .475 || .000 || .651 || 6.6 || 2.3 || .7 || .7 || 12.4
|-
| align="left" | 2007–08
| align="left" | Magnolia
| 40 || 25.2 || .452 || .158 || .690 || 4.8 || 1.9 || .9 || .5 || 9.7
|-
| align="left" | 2008–09
| align="left" | San Miguel
| 19 || 21.6 || .436 || .000 || .642 || 4.5 || 1.4 || .5 || .3 || 10.4
|-
| align="left" | 2009–10
| align="left" | San Miguel
| 39 || 17.0 || .449 || .500 || .673 || 3.2 || 1.0 || .3 || .4 || 6.9
|-
| align="left" | 2010–11
| align="left" | San Miguel / Petron
| 48 || 23.2 || .508 || .143 || .549 || 4.9 || 2.3 || .6 || .5 || 7.5
|-
| align="left" | 2011–12
| align="left" | Petron
| 40 || 22.4 || .488 || .154 || .524 || 5.1 || 2.1 || .7 || .6 || 8.1
|-
| align="left" | 2012–13
| align="left" | Petron
| 14 || 6.9 || .310 || – || .000 || 1.6 || 0.6 || .1 || .4 || 1.3
|-
| align="left" | 2013–14
| align="left" | Meralco
| 21 || 12.3 || .389 || – || .692 || 2.2 || 1.0 || .4 || .4 || 3.1
|-
| align="left" | 2014–15
| align="left" | Meralco
| 34 || 9.6 || .382 || .000 || .529 || 1.3 || .6 || .2 || .1 || 2.3
|-
| align="left" | 2022–23
| align="left" | Converge
| 1 || 4.3 || .000 || – || – || 1.0 || .0 || .0 || .0 || .0
|-
| align="center" colspan=2 | Career
| 715 || 29.2 || .466 || .198 || .674 || 6.0 || 2.3 || 0.6 || 0.7 || 10.8

Personal life
Ildefonso's early struggles with poverty during his younger years while living on a farm with his parents and his rise from being a mediocre college player to becoming a college and amateur league superstar and eventually becoming the No. 1 draft pick and the youngest player ever drafted in the PBA was shown on Maalaala Mo Kaya on ABS-CBN in 2004. Versatile actor Victor Neri portrayed him.

References

External links
 PBA.ph

1976 births
Living people
Alaska Aces (PBA) coaches
Asian Games competitors for the Philippines
Basketball players at the 2002 Asian Games
Basketball players from Pangasinan
Centers (basketball)
Converge FiberXers coaches
Converge FiberXers players
Filipino men's basketball coaches
Filipino men's basketball players
Ilocano people
Meralco Bolts players
NU Bulldogs basketball coaches
NU Bulldogs basketball players
People from Urdaneta, Pangasinan
Philippine Basketball Association All-Stars
Philippines men's national basketball team players
Power forwards (basketball)
San Miguel Beermen players
Shell Turbo Chargers draft picks